Cipriano is a masculine given name. Notable people with the name include:

First name
 Cipriano Branco (born 1985), East Timorese footballer
 Cipriano Cassamá (21st century), Bissau-Guinean politician
 Cipriano Castro (1858-1924), Venezuelan politician
 Cipriano Facchinetti (1889–1952), Italian politician
 Cipriano Ferrandini (1823-1910), Corsican-American hairdresser
 Cipriano Muñoz, 2nd Count of la Viñaza (1862-1933), Spanish diplomat
 Cipriano Efisio Oppo (1891-1962), Italian painter
 Cipriano Pérez y Arias (1784-1823), Costa Rican politician
 Cipriano Piccolpasso (1524-1579), Italian artist
 Cipriano Pons (born 1893), Argentine fencer
 Cipriano P. Primicias, Sr. (1901-1965), Filipino politician
 Cipriano Rivas Cherif (1891-1967), Spanish playwright
 Cipriano de Rore (circa 1515–1565), Franco-Flemish composer
 Cipriano Santos (20th century), Portuguese footballer
 Cipriano de Valera (17th century), Spanish Bible translator

Middle name
 Tomás Cipriano de Mosquera (1798-1878), Colombian general

Italian masculine given names
Portuguese masculine given names
Spanish masculine given names